Grzmiąca  (German: Gramenz) is a village in Szczecinek County, West Pomeranian Voivodeship, in north-western Poland. It is the seat of the gmina (administrative district) called Gmina Grzmiąca.

For the history of the region, see History of Pomerania.

The village has a population of 1,375.

References

Villages in Szczecinek County